Shri Gopal Prasad Kaushik was born in Goverdhan.

He was a prolific, popular multifaceted personality.

He was a writer, social worker, freedom-fighter, poet, translator, an "Ayurveda"-vaidya, a farmer and  much more.

Including many of his books, one of the most famous ones was Jaton Ke Jauhar.  Other books include translations of Vedas and many other original Sanskrit literary masterpieces.

Writers from Uttar Pradesh
People from Mathura